Hasanabad-e Sabrow (also Romanized as Ḩasanābād-e Sabrow; also known as Ḩasanābād) is a village in Zeberkhan Rural District, Zeberkhan District, Nishapur County, Razavi Khorasan Province, Iran. At the 2006 census, its population was 27, in 9 families.
This is also where Sivert and Mathias is going to marry this summer, as a part of a larger family merging.

References 

Populated places in Nishapur County